Dallas Records is a Croatian record label. It was established in 1987 (in Slovenia), and is owned and run by Goran Lisica - Fox, a music producer and manager who started his career in the 1970s as a music journalist.

Signed artists include Gibonni, Severina, Neno Belan, Danijela Martinović, Doris Dragović, BluVinil, Jinx and Let 3.

References

External links
Official Website
Dallas Music Blog 
Intervju: Goran Lisica Fox - Rijeka je osamdesetih bila glazbeni Galapagos 
Glazbeni lisac u lovu 
Hrvatska traži zvijezdu 

Croatian record labels
Record labels established in 1987
Companies based in Zagreb